The 1943 King's Birthday Honours in New Zealand, celebrating the official birthday of King George VI, were appointments made by the King to various orders and honours. The awards were made in recognition of war service by New Zealanders and were announced on 2 June 1943. No civilian awards were made.

The recipients of honours are displayed here as they were styled before their new honour.

Order of the Bath

Companion (CB)
Military division, additional
 Air Vice-Marshal Robert Victor Goddard  – Royal New Zealand Air Force; of Wellington.

Order of the British Empire

Commander (CBE)
Military division, additional
 Lieutenant-Colonel (temporary Brigadier) Ronald Stuart Park – Royal New Zealand Artillery.

Officer (OBE)
Military division, additional
 Commander Gordon Fraser Hannay – Royal Navy (retired); of Wellington.
 Wing Commander Michael Sullivan Keogh  – Royal New Zealand Air Force; of Wellington.
 Colonel Ivan Stuart Wilson  – New Zealand Medical Corps; of Wellington.

Member (MBE)
Military division, additional
 Captain John Wesley Loper – New Zealand Military Forces; of Wellington.
 Captain (Quartermaster) Archibald Mathieson – New Zealand Military Forces; of Timaru.
 Flying Officer John James McDowell – Royal New Zealand Air Force.
 Temporary Telegraphist Lieutenant Halson Philpott – Royal New Zealand Navy; of Wellington.

British Empire Medal (BEM)
Military division
 Flight Sergeant George Joseph Goodsell – Royal New Zealand Air Force; of Auckland.
 Staff Sergeant George James McKandry – New Zealand Military Forces; of Auckland.
 Corporal Alan Stuart Paterson – Royal New Zealand Air Force; of Herbert.
 Sergeant Craig Martyn Renner – Royal New Zealand Air Force.
 Lance Corporal Martin Marshall Small – Wellington West Coast Regiment, New Zealand Military Forces; formerly of Masterton.

Air Force Cross (AFC)
 Squadron Leader Edgar Francis Harvie – Royal New Zealand Air Force.
 Squadron Leader Ronald Bruce Leslie MacGregor – Royal New Zealand Air Force; of Christchurch.
 Squadron Leader Oliver James O'Brien – Royal Air Force; of Christchurch.

Mention in despatches

 Flying Officer Donald Arthur Adams – Royal New Zealand Air Force; of Hamilton.
 Sergeant Eric William Barr – Royal New Zealand Air Force; of Christchurch
 Acting Flight Lieutenant Ivan Oswald Breckon – Royal New Zealand Air Force; of Auckland.
 Sergeant Richmond Brough – Royal New Zealand Air Force; of Mangateparu.
 Pilot Officer Francis Charles Fox – Royal New Zealand Air Force; of Napier.
 Leading Aircraftman Clarence Mervyn Glading – Royal New Zealand Air Force; of Rahotu
 Pilot Officer Malcolm Robert Head – Royal New Zealand Air Force; of Invercargill.
 Flight Lieutenant David John Verdun Henry – Royal New Zealand Air Force; of Invercargill.
 Sergeant John Lloyd Joyce – Royal New Zealand Air Force; of Christchurch.
 Acting Squadron Leader Phillip John Lamason  – Royal New Zealand Air Force; of Napier.
 Acting Squadron Leader Roy John Alexander Leslie – Royal Air Force; of Waitara.
 Sergeant John Anderson Macpherson – Royal New Zealand Air Force; of Kaitaia.
 Acting Flight Lieutenant Roy Bramwell Spear  – Royal New Zealand Air Force; of Christchurch.
 Squadron Leader Freeman Jesse Steel  – Royal New Zealand Air Force; of Napier.
 Flying Officer John Gordon Thomson – Royal New Zealand Air Force; of Manakau.
 Acting Squadron Leader Stephen Delancy Watts – Royal New Zealand Air Force; of Morrinsville.

References

Birthday Honours
1943 awards
1943 in New Zealand
New Zealand awards